Tengiz Beridze (Georgian: თენგიზ გიორგის ძე ბერიძე) is a Georgian biochemist. He was born on 26 October 1939 in Tbilisi, Georgian SSR, USSR.

Career 
In 1967 he discovered satellite DNA in plants. Through his research from 1972 to 1975, it was found that closely related species of one genus differ in satellite DNA content. In 1986 he published the monograph Satellite DNA in Springer Edition. In 2013 this monograph was edited as an eBOOK.
In 2011-17 he established a complete nucleotide sequence of four Georgian grape varieties, nuclear, chloroplast and mitochondria.
In 2015-21 he established a complete chloroplast DNA sequence of Georgian wheat species

In 1967, he defended his Candidate's Dissertation. In 1980, he defended his doctoral dissertation in the Bakh Institute of Biochemistry, Moscow. He is elected a corresponding member of the Academy of Sciences of Georgia in 1987 and a full member in 1993.

Beridze held various positions in Soviet and Georgian institutions since 1960s.

Positions 
1968–2008 - Institute of Biochemistry and Biotechnology, Georgian Academy of Sciences
1968–1999 - Professor at Tbilisi State University, Georgia
2008–2010 - Professor at Ilia State University, Tbilisi, Georgia
2010–2011 - Professor at Free University of Tbilisi, Georgia 
2012–2021-  Director of Institute of Molecular Genetics, Agricultural University of Georgia
2012–present - Professor at Agricultural University of Georgia, Tbilisi, Georgia

Awards 
Beridze was awarded the Order of Honour of Georgia in 1999. He was awarded the Serge Durmishidze prize in Biochemistry in 2009.

Selected publications 
Beridze TG, Odintsova MS, Sissakian NM (1967)  Distribution of bean leaf DNA 	components in the cell organelle fractions. Molek.Biol.USSR.  1,142-153 
Beridze TG (1972) DNA nuclear satellites of the genus Phaseolus. Biochim. Biophys. Acta  262,393-396
Beridze TG (1975) DNA nuclear satellites of the genus Brassica: variation between species. Biochim.Biophys.Acta.  395,274-279
Beridze T. Satellite DNA, 1986, Springer-Verlag, Berlin, Heidelberg, New York, Tokio
Beridze T, Pipia I, Beck J., Hsu S.-CT, Gamkrelidze M, Gogniashvili M, Tabidze V, This R,Bacilieri P, Gotsiridze V, Glonti M,  Schaal B (2011). Plastid DNA sequence diversity in a worldwide set of grapevine cultivars (Vitis vinifera L. subsp. vinifera). Bulletin of the Georgian National Academy of Sciences. 5, 2011, 98–103.
Pipia I, Gogniashvili M, Tabidze V, Beridze T, Gamkrelidze M, Gotsiridze V, Melyan G, Musayev M, Salimov V, Beck J, Schaal B (2012) Plastid DNA sequence diversity in wild grapevine samples (Vitis vinifera subsp. sylvestris) from the Caucasus region. Vitis 51 (3), 119–124 
Tabidze V, Baramidze G, Pipia I, Gogniashvili M, Ujmajuridze L, Beridze T, Hernandez AG, Schaal B (2014) The Complete Chloroplast DNA Sequence of    Eleven Grape Cultivars. Simultaneous Resequencing Methodology. Journal  International des Sciences de la Vigne et du Vin J Int Sci Vigne Vin. 48,  99-109
Tabidze V, Pipia I, Gogniashvili M, Kunelauri N, Ujmajuridze L, Pirtskhalava M,    Vishnepolsky B, Hernandez AG, Fields CJ, BeridzeT (2017) Whole genome comparative analysis of four Georgian grape cultivars. Molecular Genetics and Genomics.  292, 1377-1389
Gogniashvili M., Naskidashvili P., Bedoshvili D., Kotorashvili  A., Kotaria  N., Beridze T. (2015) Complete chloroplast DNA sequences of Zanduri wheat (Triticum spp.) Genet Resour Crop Evol 
Gogniashvili M, Jinjikhadze T, Maisaia M, Akhalkatsi  M, Kotorashvili A, Kotaria N, Beridze T, Dudnikov AJ (2016) Complete chloroplast genomes of Aegilops tauschii Coss. and Ae.cylindrica Host sheds light on plasmon D evolution. Current  Genetics.
Gogniashvili M, Maisaia I, Kotorashvili A, Kotaria N, Beridze T (2018)  Complete chloroplast DNA sequences of Georgian indigenous polyploid wheats (Triticum spp.) and B plasmon evolution. Genet Resour Crop Evol 65:1995–2002

References 

1939 births
Georgian Soviet Socialist Republic people
Scientists from Tbilisi
Biochemists
Academic staff of Tbilisi State University
Academic staff of Ilia State University
Free University of Tbilisi people
Recipients of the Order of Honor (Georgia)
Living people